Our Lady of the Assassins is a 2000 romantic crime drama film directed by Barbet Schroeder from a screenplay by Fernando Vallejo, based on his 1994 novel of the same title. The film follows a Colombian author in his 50s who returns to his hometown of Medellín after 30 years of absence to find himself trapped in an atmosphere of violence and murder caused by drug cartel warfare.

Plot
Fernando meets Alexis, a handsome gay youth, at a party of one of his old friends and immediately falls for him. The two begin a relationship which, apart from the sex, consists mainly in Fernando telling Alexis how pastoral the city was when he left, while Alexis explains to Fernando the ins and outs of everyday robbery, violence, and shootings. Even though Fernando has come home to die, his sarcastic worldview is mellowed somewhat by his relationship with Alexis.

He soon discovers that Alexis is a gang member and hitman (or sicario) himself, and that members of other gangs are after him. After several assassination attempts fail because of Alexis' skillful handling of his Beretta, he is finally killed by two boys on a motorcycle. Fernando is partly responsible for this, as Alexis' weapon has been lost before the murder due to Fernando's suicidal impulses.

Fernando visits Alexis' mother and gives her some money, and then walks through the streets aimlessly when he encounters Wilmar (Juan David Restrepo), who bears a striking resemblance to Alexis, not only in his looks but in his entire manner.

He invites Wilmar for lunch and the two begin an affair, rekindling the kind of relationship he had with Alexis. Wilmar is also a killer, but it is a shocking revelation  to Fernando when he finds out that Wilmar is the one who shot Alexis. He vows to kill Wilmar, but then learns it was Alexis who started the violence by killing Wilmar's brother, calling for vengeance on him by Wilmar.

When Wilmar goes to say goodbye to his mother before he and Fernando leave the country together, he is killed as well. Seeing that the vicious cycle of atrocities in Medellín denies happiness, Fernando presumably commits suicide, if the last scene is taken to hint at that.

Cast
  as Fernando
  as Alexis
 Juan David Restrepo as Wilmar
  as Alfonso

Production
The film was shot with early high-definition video cameras (Sony HDW-700) in the year 2000. The digital video gives the film a cinéma vérité look and was one of the first uses of HD video for a feature film.

See also
 Movies depicting Colombia
 List of Colombian films

References

External links
 
 

2000 films
2000 crime drama films
2000 LGBT-related films
2000 romantic drama films
2000s Spanish-language films
Colombian crime drama films
Colombian LGBT-related films
Films about Colombian drug cartels
Films based on Colombian novels
Films directed by Barbet Schroeder
Films produced by Barbet Schroeder
Films produced by Margaret Ménégoz
Films set in Colombia
Films shot in Colombia
French crime drama films
French LGBT-related films
French romantic drama films
LGBT-related romantic drama films
Romantic crime films
Spanish crime drama films
Spanish LGBT-related films
Spanish romantic drama films
2000s French films